Al Bawaba (البوابة, Arabic for "the portal" or "the gate") is a news, blogging and media website headquartered in Amman, Jordan with an office in Dubai, United Arab Emirates. Since 2001 it publishes the Mena Report, which covers the business and economics in Arab world. Al Bawaba bills itself as "the largest independent producer and distributor of content in the Middle East... [with] a full-time staff of journalists and editors covering the Middle East and North Africa region's events and news".

History and content
Al Bawaba was launched in 2000, and is owned by Al Bawaba Middle East Limited based in Amman, Jordan. It had an office in Kuwait.

The network consists of several web portals and websites, besides Al Bawaba including Al Bawaba Blogs, Al Bawaba Music (music site), Al Bawaba Games (Later Gaming Zone), Sharekna (online photo and video management service), SyndiGate (digital content syndication service). It publishes news stories related to the Middle East. It has separate English and Arabic sections.

References

External links
 

2000 establishments in Jordan
Internet properties established in 2000
Jordanian news websites
English-language websites
Arabic-language websites
Mass media in Amman